Mesbah Deghiche (born March 30, 1981 in Kouba, Algiers) is an Algerian footballer. He currently plays for MC El Eulma in the Algerian Ligue Professionnelle 1.

Personal
Mesbah's younger brother, Rafik, is also a footballer.

External links
 DZFoot Profile
 

1981 births
Algerian footballers
Living people
Footballers from Algiers
JSM Béjaïa players
US Biskra players
MC Alger players
MO Béjaïa players
MC El Eulma players
Algerian Ligue Professionnelle 1 players
Algeria under-23 international footballers
Algeria youth international footballers
Association football forwards
21st-century Algerian people
20th-century Algerian people